Route 116 is a state highway running  in Providence County, and Kent County, Rhode Island. Its southern terminus is at Route 33 and Route 117 in Coventry, and its northern terminus is at Route 114 in Cumberland.

Route description
Route 116 begins at an intersection with RI-33 and RI-117 in Coventry, Rhode Island. It is known as Knotty Oak Road. In Scituate, the route runs . The highway intersects the following routes from south to north: Route 115, Route 12, Route 14, and US 6. In Glocester, the route runs . It reaches US 44 in Smithfield. It runs concurrent with US 44 for half a mile. Then, it turns northeast. It continues as Pleasant View Avenue as it then meets Route 104. It runs concurrently north with Route 104, then turns east as the George Washington Highway. The George Washington Highway is a rural, two-laned expressway with a 50 mph speed limit. The road continues east and ends at Route 114 in Cumberland.

Major intersections

Notes

Route 116 is a major corridor in Lincoln, Cumberland and parts of Smithfield.

The interchange between Route 116 and Route 146 was the first cloverleaf interchange to be constructed in the state.  In the mid-2000s the ramps in the interchange's southeast quadrant were removed, being replaced by rebuilt ramps in the northeast quadrant which join 116 at a new signaled intersection with turn lanes.

References

External links

2019 Highway Map, Rhode Island

116
Transportation in Kent County, Rhode Island
Transportation in Providence County, Rhode Island
Coventry, Rhode Island
Lincoln, Rhode Island
Scituate, Rhode Island
Glocester, Rhode Island
Smithfield, Rhode Island
Cumberland, Rhode Island